FK Hořovicko is a Czech football club located in Hořovice. It currently plays in Divize A, which is in the Czech Fourth Division. Pavel Trávník was announced as their new coach on 11 July 2011, replacing Jan Berger.

References

External links
  

Football clubs in the Czech Republic
Association football clubs established in 2008
2008 establishments in the Czech Republic